Antaeotricha carabodes is a moth of the family Depressariidae. It is found in Guyana.

The wingspan is about 23 mm. The forewings are deep greyish-purple and the hindwings are blackish-grey.

References

Moths described in 1915
carabodes
Taxa named by Edward Meyrick
Moths of South America